Augsburg-Stadt (English: Augsburg City) is an electoral constituency (German: Wahlkreis) represented in the Bundestag. It elects one member via first-past-the-post voting. Under the current constituency numbering system, it is designated as constituency 252. It is located in southwestern Bavaria, comprising the city of Augsburg.

Augsburg-Stadt was created for the inaugural 1949 federal election. Since 2013, it has been represented by Volker Ullrich of the Christian Social Union (CSU).

Geography
Augsburg-Stadt is located in southwestern Bavaria. As of the 2021 federal election, it comprises the independent city of Augsburg-Stadt and the municipality of Königsbrunn from the district of Landkreis Augsburg.

History
Augsburg-Stadt was created in 1949. In the 1965 through 1972 elections, it was named Augsburg. In the 1949 election, it was Bavaria constituency 41 in the numbering system. In the 1953 through 1961 elections, it was number 236. In the 1965 through 1998 elections, it was number 238. In the 2002 and 2005 elections, it was number 253. Since the 2009 election, it has been number 252.

Originally, the constituency was coterminous with the independent city of Augsburg. It acquired its current borders in the 1998 election.

Members
The constituency has been held by the Christian Social Union (CSU) during all but one Bundestag term since its creation. It was first represented by Josef Ferdinand Kleindinst from 1949 to 1957, followed by Otto Weinkamm from 1957 to 1965. Anton Ott was representative from 1965 to 1972. Max Amling of the Social Democratic Party (SPD) was elected in 1972 and served one term. Stefan Höpfinger regained the constituency for the CSU in 1976, and served until 1990. Christian Ruck was then representative from 1990 to 2013. Volker Ullrich was elected in 2013, and re-elected in 2017 and 2021.

Election results

2021 election

2017 election

2013 election

2009 election

References

Federal electoral districts in Bavaria
1949 establishments in West Germany
Constituencies established in 1949
Augsburg
Augsburg (district)